Daniel dos Santos Penha (born 17 October 1998), commonly known as Daniel Penha, is a Brazilian footballer who plays as an attacking midfielder for K League 1 club Daegu FC, on loan from Atlético Mineiro.

Career statistics

Club

Honours
Atlético Mineiro
Campeonato Mineiro: 2017

Sampaio Corrêa
Campeonato Maranhense: 2020

Bahia
Copa do Nordeste: 2021

Individual
A-Leagues All Star: 2022
 PFA A-League Men Team of the Season: 2021–22

References

1998 births
Living people
Footballers from Brasília
Brazilian footballers
Association football midfielders
Campeonato Brasileiro Série B players
A-League Men players
K League 1 players
Clube Atlético Mineiro players
Clube de Regatas Brasil players
Coimbra Esporte Clube players
Sampaio Corrêa Futebol Clube players
Sport Club Corinthians Paulista players
Esporte Clube Bahia players
Associação Desportiva Confiança players
Newcastle Jets FC players
Daegu FC players
Brazilian expatriate footballers
Brazilian expatriate sportspeople in Australia
Brazilian expatriate sportspeople in South Korea
Expatriate soccer players in Australia
Expatriate footballers in South Korea